Pristicon is a genus of cardinalfishes native to the western Pacific Ocean.

Species
The recognized species in this genus are:
 Pristicon rhodopterus (Bleeker, 1852) (redfin cardinalfish)
 Pristicon rufus (J. E. Randall & T. H. Fraser, 1999) (rufous cardinalfish)
 Pristicon trimaculatus (G. Cuvier, 1828) (three-spot cardinalfish)

References

Apogoninae
Marine fish genera
Taxa named by Thomas H. Fraser